The Australian Racing Board, established in 1998, is the peak national administration body for Thoroughbred racing in Australia. The statutory bodies for racing in each State or Territory, known as the Principal Racing Authorities, set up the Australian Racing Board by consensual agreement. This consensus by the States is achieved by agreeing to abide by and to enforce the Australian Rules of Racing which are within the authority of the ARB.

State based authorities

The Principal Racing Authorities are:

Racing Victoria Limited
NSW Thoroughbred Racing Board
Thoroughbred Racing S.A Limited
Racing Queensland Limited
Racing and Wagering Western Australia
Tasmanian Thoroughbred Racing Council
Darwin Turf Club
Canberra Racing Club

Scope of the authority 

It is the Australian Racing Board’s responsibility to ensure that thoroughbred racing in all States and Territories of Australia is conducted according to the same general practices, conditions and integrity.

The on-course responsibility for the supervision of the fair-running of races is delegated to the racing stewards, veterinarians and analysts who conduct the race meetings on behalf of the race clubs, and strictly apply the Rules of Racing.

The Australian Rules of Racing also provide for a Racing Appeals Tribunal to enable a person punished by the stewards to seek a review by a body that is independent of the racing industry.

Besides its administration role, the Australian Racing Board has a number of advisory groups which investigate, discuss, make recommendations, and give advice on matters such as Equine integrity and welfare, Group and Listed races, Rules Review and Handicapping.

Registration of racehorses 

The Australian Stud Book, an independent organisation, and the Registrar of Racehorses also submit reports to the Australian Racing Board. In September 2014 the Board announced it would merge with the Australian Stud Book and Racing Information Services Australia to form a new national body to administer thoroughbred racing, to be called Racing Australia.

References

External links
 Australian Racing Board web site

Horse racing organisations in Australia
Sports governing bodies in Australia
1998 establishments in Australia
Sports organizations established in 1998